Oswestry Rural is a geographically large civil parish located in Shropshire, England. It is situated south of Oswestry itself, and extends from the border with Wales in the west.

The parish includes the villages of Rhydycroesau, Trefonen, Morda, Maesbury, and various other hamlets including Treflach, Whitehaven, Tyn-y-coed,  Croesau Bach, Ball and Aston Square.

See also
Listed buildings in Oswestry Rural

References

Civil parishes in Shropshire